Round Timber is an unincorporated community in Baylor County, in the U.S. state of Texas. According to the Handbook of Texas, only 2 people lived in the community in 2000.

History
Round Timber was founded when a cabin was built by John W. Stevens in 1874. Colonel C.C. Mills tried to settle in the area in either the late 1850s or 60s but was forced out by Native American tribes. He then returned in 1875. It was named Round Timber for two trees that were used to build with. It moved four miles northwest and became a local trading center. Its population was 25 in 1940, 10 in 1980, 8 in 1990, and only 2 in 2000.

Geography
Round Timber is located on Farm to Market Road 2374 near the Throckmorton County line in southeastern Baylor County.

Education
Today, the community is served by the Seymour Independent School District.

References

Unincorporated communities in Baylor County, Texas
Unincorporated communities in Texas